The 1955 Marquette Warriors football team was an American football team that represented Marquette University as an independent during the 1955 college football season. In its second and final season under head coach Frosty Ferzacca, the team compiled a 2–6–1 record and was outscored by a total of 194 to 77. The team played its home games at Marquette Stadium in Milwaukee.

Schedule

References

Marquette
Marquette Golden Avalanche football seasons
Marquette Warriors football